American Club may refer to:

American Club (eikaiwa), an English school in Tochigi Prefecture, Japan
American Club (Kohler, Wisconsin), a resort
American Club, London, a former gentlemen's club, founded in 1918
American Club, Shangai
American Club Hong Kong, an elite club with locations in Victoria City on Hong Kong Island and in Tai Tam
Tokyo American Club, a social club for expats in Tokyo